Glenea joliveti is a species of beetle in the family Cerambycidae. It was described by Stephan von Breuning in 1970.

References

joliveti
Beetles described in 1970